Levan Ioselaini (born 20 June 1978) is a Georgian political figure currently serving as the Public Defender of Georgia. Ioseliani was elected to Parliament by party list, bloc: "Aleko Elisashvili – Citizens" and served as the Deputy Speaker from 2021 to 2023.

Biography

 1999 - 2000: JSC “Bank of Georgia”, lawyer
 2000 - 2001: JSC “TBC Bank”, senior lawyer
 2001 - 2008: Law Firm “Aslanishvili and Ioseliani”, Founder
 2008 - 2016: “Levan Ioseliani Law Firm”, Lawyer
 2016 - 2017: Chicago Law Mediation Program, mediator
 2018 - 2020: NPLE “Civil Movement of Georgia”, Executive Director

References

External links
 His biography on site of Parliament of Georgia

1978 births
Living people
Members of the Parliament of Georgia
21st-century politicians from Georgia (country)